Shahrak-e Pain (also romanized as Shahrak-e Pā’īn; also known as Nizhnyaya Shayryay, Now Shahrak, Shabrak, Shahrak, and Shahrak Tāzeh) is a village in Bedevostan-e Gharbi Rural District, Khvajeh District, Heris County, East Azerbaijan Province, Iran. At the 2006 census, its population was 686, in 150 families.

References 

Populated places in Heris County